The 1956 USAC Championship Car season consisted of 12 races, beginning in Speedway, Indiana, on May 30 and concluding in Phoenix, Arizona, on November 12.  There were also three non-championship events.  The USAC National Champion was Jimmy Bryan and the Indianapolis 500 winner was Pat Flaherty.  This was the first year that the National Championship was sanctioned by the USAC, after the withdrawal of the AAA from all forms of racing after the 1955 season.

Schedule and results

 Indianapolis 500 was USAC-sanctioned and counted towards the 1956 FIA World Championship of Drivers title.
 No pole is awarded for the Pikes Peak Hill Climb, in this schedule on the pole is the driver who started first. No lap led was awarded for the Pikes Peak Hill Climb, however, a lap was awarded to the drivers that completed the climb.

Final points standings

References

General references
 
 
 
 http://media.indycar.com/pdf/2011/IICS_2011_Historical_Record_Book_INT6.pdf  (p. 282-283)

See also
 1956 Indianapolis 500

USAC Championship Car season
USAC Championship Car
1956 in American motorsport